"Next to You" is a song recorded by Australian record producer L D R U, featuring Brisbane-based vocalist Savoi and was released in April 2016 as the second single from L D R U's debut studio album, Sizzlar (2017).

In January 2017, the song was voted number 68 in the Triple J Hottest 100, 2016. It was certified gold in Australia in 2017.

Track listing
Digital download
 "Next to You" – 2:56

Digital download
 "Next to You" (Barely Alive and Virtual Riot remix)– 4:24
 "Next to You" (Kyle Watson remix)– 5:19
 "Next to You" (Nine Lives remix)– 3:48
 "Next to You" (No Way Back remix)– 3:12
 "Next to You" (Time Pilot remix)– 3:26
 "Next to You" (Onda remix)– 2:50

Certification

References

2016 songs
2016 singles
L D R U songs
Australian pop songs